Mansfield Center is a village within the town of Mansfield in Tolland County, Connecticut, United States. The village is the basis of a  census-designated place (CDP) of the same name with a population of 947 at the 2010 census. The CDP includes the original settlement of Mansfield, Mansfield Center or Mansfield Village, as well as the village of Mansfield Hollow. Mansfield Hollow State Park is also located within the boundaries of the CDP.

Demographics
As of the census of 2000, there were 973 people, 373 households, and 239 families residing in the CDP.  The population density was 123.2/km2 (318.9/mi2).  There were 382 housing units at an average density of 48.4/km2 (125.2/mi2).  The racial makeup of the CDP was 92.19% White, 1.23% African American, 0.21% Native American, 4.01% Asian, 0.10% Pacific Islander, 0.41% from other races, and 1.85% from two or more races. Hispanic or Latino of any race were 1.44% of the population.

There were 373 households, out of which 25.7% had children under the age of 18 living with them, 55.2% were married couples living together, 6.2% had a female householder with no husband present, and 35.9% were non-families. 26.3% of all households were made up of individuals, and 9.7% had someone living alone who was 65 years of age or older.  The average household size was 2.38 and the average family size was 2.85.

In the CDP, the population was spread out, with 18.8% under the age of 18, 8.1% from 18 to 24, 23.8% from 25 to 44, 25.9% from 45 to 64, and 23.3% who were 65 years of age or older.  The median age was 44 years. For every 100 females, there were 87.5 males.  For every 100 females age 18 and over, there were 85.4 males.

The median income for a household in the CDP was $53,125, and the median income for a family was $76,194. Males had a median income of $40,625 versus $29,886 for females. The per capita income for the CDP was $24,401.  About 2.9% of families and 7.2% of the population were below the poverty line, including 12.7% of those under age 18 and none of those age 65 or over.

Historic features

Mansfield Center Cemetery, which contains many 18th-century gravestones, is listed on the National Register of Historic Places as a fine example of the rich artistic tradition of funerary stone carving in  colonial New England.

Historic buildings in Mansfield Center include the Barrows and Burnham Store, a general store built in 1886.

Geography 
According to the United States Census Bureau, the CDP has a total area of 8.8 km2 (3.4 mi2).  7.9 km2 (3.0 mi2) of it is land and 0.9 km2 (0.4 mi2) of it (10.56%) is water.

Climate

Notable residents
Peter Tork, musician and actor with The Monkees
Theodore Stowell, early president of Bryant University

References

Further reading
 Historic Mansfield Center, Mansfield Historical Society, 2001

Census-designated places in Tolland County, Connecticut
Mansfield, Connecticut
Census-designated places in Connecticut
Villages in Connecticut